1981 Japanese Super Cup was the Japanese Super Cup competition. The match was played at National Stadium in Tokyo on April 5, 1981. Yanmar Diesel won the championship.

Match details

References

Japanese Super Cup
1981 in Japanese football
Cerezo Osaka matches
Urawa Red Diamonds matches